Operation Quicksilver was a series of 16 nuclear tests conducted by the United States in 1978–1979 at the Nevada Test Site. These tests followed the Operation Cresset series and preceded the Operation Tinderbox series.

References

1978 in military history
1979 in military history
1978 in the United States
1979 in the United States
Explosions in 1978
Explosions in 1979
Quicksilver